AviaPANH was a Russian charter helicopter operator based in Ivanovo. Its licence was revoked in October 2011.

Fleet

References

Defunct airlines of Russia
Airlines established in 1991
Airlines disestablished in 2011
1991 establishments in Russia
Companies based in Ivanovo Oblast